Duncan Canal may refer to several places:

 Duncan Canal (Louisiana), the West Return Canal outside of New Orleans
 Duncan Canal (Alaska), an inland waterway in the Alexander Archipelago of Alaska's panhandle
 Duncan Canal (volcanic field), a volcanic field on Kupreanof Island, Alaska